The Gujarat women's cricket team is a women's cricket team that represents the Indian state of Gujarat. The team competes in the Women's Senior One Day Trophy and the Women's Senior T20 Trophy.

See also
 Gujarat cricket team

References

Cricket in Gujarat
Women's cricket teams in India